Tatsunosuke (written: 達之助, 達之輔 or 辰之助) is a masculine Japanese given name. Notable people with the name include:

, Japanese translator and writer
, Japanese shogi player
, Japanese businessman and politician
, Japanese politician

Japanese masculine given names